Tre Brown (born September 24, 1997) is an American football cornerback for the Seattle Seahawks of the National Football League (NFL). He played college football at Oklahoma.

Early life and high school
Brown was born and raised in Tulsa, Oklahoma, where he attended the Union High School. He committed to play cornerback at Oklahoma and rejected offers from schools such as: LSU, Florida, USC and Texas.

Professional career

On May 1, 2021, Brown was drafted by the Seattle Seahawks in the fourth round of the 2021 NFL Draft.
On May 21, 2021, after the rookie mini camp, Seahawks signed Brown to a 4-year deal worth $4.1 million with a $640K signing bonus. He was placed on injured reserve on September 7, 2021 with a knee sprain. He was activated on October 15. He suffered a knee injury in Week 11 and was placed on season-ending injured reserve on November 27.

Brown was placed on the Active/PUP list on July 26, 2022. He was placed on the reserve list to start the season on August 28, 2022. He was activated on November 15.

References

External links
Oklahoma bio

Living people
American football cornerbacks
Oklahoma Sooners football players
Players of American football from Oklahoma
Seattle Seahawks players
Sportspeople from Tulsa, Oklahoma
1997 births